A nasal vaccine is a vaccine administered to a person via the nose and does not require a needle. It induces immunity through the inner surface of the nose, a surface that naturally comes in contact with many airborne microbes.

Administration
Administering a vaccine via the nose is painless, non-invasive and easier to perform than using a needle, which has risks of needle stick injuries and issues relating to safe disposal.

Nasal vaccine technology
A few different devices have become available for the nasal delivery of vaccines.

Live attenuated influenza vaccine

Nasal live attenuated influenza vaccine (LAIV) is available under the brand name FluMist Quadrivalent in the United States and the brand name Fluenz Tetra in Europe. In addition to the antigens (active ingredient), nasal flu vaccine contains gelatin, small amounts of amino acids and sucrose, which act as stabilizers.

Veterinary medicine
In veterinary medicine, vaccination against Bordetella bronchiseptica, a cause of kennel cough, can be delivered by the nasal route in dogs.

History
Kangxi Emperor, in the 17th century, claimed that to protect his entire family and army from smallpox he had them all inoculated, a procedure described in manuals of the time as involving the technique of "blowing smallpox material up the nose" or insufflation. The material used varied from ground-up dry scabs to fluid collected from a pustule.

The September 11 attacks of 2001 and the subsequent anthrax attacks stimulated interest in vaccines that could be stored and stockpiled, including developments in a nasal vaccine for anthrax.

Research on nasal vaccine candidates for COVID-19
In an experiment in 2004, a nasal vaccine was given to four African green monkeys in the search for a vaccine for SARS-CoV.

In August 2020, during the COVID-19 pandemic, studies in mice and monkeys demonstrated that protection from the new coronavirus might be obtained through the nasal route. Another study postulated that if a COVID-19 vaccine could be given by a spray in the nose, people might be able to vaccinate themselves.

In September 2022, India and China approved  first nasal COVID-19 vaccines which may (as boosters) also reduce transmission (potentially via sterilizing immunity). Meanwhile, scientists in the United States encountered bureaucratic obstacles in their efforts to develop nasal vaccines for COVID-19.

See also
 Nasal administration
 Mucosal immunology

References 

Vaccination
Drug delivery devices